Regisauridae is an extinct family of small carnivorous theriodonts from the Late Permian and Early Triassic of South Africa and China.

Classification
Below is a cladogram modified from analysis published by Adam K. Huttenlocker in 2014.

References

Baurioids
Lopingian first appearances
Early Triassic extinctions
Prehistoric therapsid families